Scopula subnictata is a moth of the family Geometridae. It is found in Colombia.

Subspecies
Scopula subnictata subnictata (Colombia)
Scopula subnictata cuphoptera Prout, 1938 (Colombia)

References

Moths described in 1874
subnictata
Moths of South America